Lal Bahadur Shastri Marg, commonly known by its abbreviation LBS Marg, is a 21 km long, major arterial road connecting the neighbouring city of Thane with Sion in Mumbai. It passes through heavily populated areas of the Eastern Suburbs in Mumbai and is heavily congested. Approximately, 3 lakh vehicles use this road daily. The road is named after Lal Bahadur Shastri, the second Prime Minister of India.

Route description
LBS Marg begins at Thane, extending from the Old Agra Road and the Ghodbunder Road. It intersects the Eastern Express Highway (EEH) at Marathon Chowk. When travelling between Mumbai and Thane, commuters have to pay a toll. The toll gate (called naaka in Marathi) is called Teen Hath Naaka. LBS Marg then passes through all the eastern suburbs, from Mulund till Sion, where it joins with the EEH near the Sion Flyover. Both LBS Marg and the EEH pass through Thane and the Eastern Suburbs but they pass to the west and east of the Central Line respectively. LBS Marg has only 4 lanes. However, only 2 lanes are in use now due to ongoing metro work. It passes through residential and commercial areas making it more congested and encroached upon. On the other hand, EEH is wide, well-maintained and smooth. It goes through an uninhabited area where development is prohibited.

LBS Marg also offers connectivity to the Western Suburbs when it intersects the Andheri – Ghatkopar Link Road and the JVLR. The road also intersects the BKC Road at Kurla providing connectivity to the Bandra Kurla Complex, and onward to Bandra. It also offers connectivity to the Harbour Suburbs when it intersects the Ghatkopar-Mankhurd Link Road (GMLR).

LBS Marg is connected to Kalina from Kurla via a 6m bridge over the Mithi river.

The Mumbai Metro Line 4, which will pass through LBS, is under construction.

Planning 
The Brihanmumbai Municipal Corporation (BMC) has had plans to widen LBS Marg since 1970. The BMC decided to revitalize and finance the project in 2012. The work will require the demolition of 2000 buildings, 80 per cent of which are commercial properties. BMC estimates the cost of acquiring properties for demolition to be . The plan was to widen LBS Marg to 6 lanes (a width of 120 feet) from 4 lanes (60–80 feet width). However, with metro construction work going on from the stretch from Thane to Ghatkopar, the width of the road has actually reduced in places to just 12 feet on either side.

Current status 
The LBS Road is known for heavy encroachment and almost nil enforcement of traffic and civic rules or town planning guidelines. It is common to see vehicles encroaching footpaths, wrong-side driving by all types of vehicles including heavy goods vehicles and jaywalking in the absence of pedestrian crossings. The ongoing Metro construction work on the central median has resulted in the road width reducing to just 12 feet in certain pockets, with no footpaths for pedestrian movement. As a result, the vehicular speeds on the road have fallen to an average of 3 km/h (1.8 mph) during peak hours.
In addition, the road has the highest number of flood-prone spots in the Eastern suburbs, with yearly flooding a common phenomenon.

Real Estate 

Conversion from primarily an industrial region to a mixed-use area began in the 2000s.

LBS Marg has several malls, apartment complexes and corporate offices along it. Some of Mumbai's most prominent malls – R-Mall (Mulund), Neptune Magnet Mall (Bhandup), R City Mall (Ghatkopar) and Phoenix Marketcity (Kurla) – are located on LBS Marg. Godrej and Boyce IT Park, located in Vikhroli, houses the offices of several IT firms. Corporates like Accenture, Capgemini, TCS, Wipro, WNS Spectramind, ICICI Prudential, HCC, Colgate-Palmolive and Cipla have offices on LBS Marg. Runwal Forests in Kanjurgmarg, Godrej Park Site and Raj Legacy in Vikhroli, Kalpataru Aura and The Address in Ghatkopar, and HDIL's Dreams and Whispering Towers in Bhandup are some notable residential complexes on LBS Marg.

Some manufacturing facilities continue to exist on or near LBS Road, notably Johnson & Johnson (Mulund), Ceat Tyres, Asian Paints and ShangriLa Biscuits (Bhandup), Jai Hind Oil Mills (Kanjurmarg), Everest Spices and Godrej Industries (Vikhroli).

References

Roads in Mumbai
Memorials to Lal Bahadur Shastri